L’Autorité Nationale d’Assurance Qualité de l’enseignement Supérieur (National Authority for Quality Assurance in Higher Education, ANAQ-Sup) is a state agency in Senegal under the supervision of the Ministère de l’Enseignement Supérieur et de la Recherche (Ministry of Higher Education and Research, MESR). It serves to ensure and improve the quality of higher education programs and institutions in the country. It was created in August 2012 in the wake of governance reforms undertaken in higher education.

External links
 

Educational organisations based in Senegal